The Scottish Crop Research Institute more commonly known as SCRI was a scientific institute located in Invergowrie near Dundee, Scotland. As of April 2011, when SCRI  merged with the Macaulay Land Use Institute it is now part of The James Hutton Institute.

History

The institute was opened in 1951 in Invergowrie under the name Scottish Horticultural Research Institute (SHRI). In 1981, the SHRI merged with the Scottish Plant Breeding Station (SPBS), which at the time was located near Edinburgh. Operations of the SPBS moved to the institute's site at Invergowrie and became the Scottish Crop Research Institute. In 1987 the institute accepted managerial responsibility for Biomathematics & Statistics Scotland, formerly the Scottish Agricultural Statistics Service. The commercial arm of the SCRI, Mylnefield Research Services, was launched in 1989. In April 2011 SCRI  merged with the Macaulay Land Use Institute to form a new body, The James Hutton Institute.

Research

The SCRI has both staff and PhD students who do research into several different aspects of plant science. Research facilities include laboratories, office space, glasshouses, growth chambers and 172 hectares of land which is used for field work. Research at SCRI is organised into four programmes: environment plant interactions, plant pathology, genetics and plant products and food quality. The institute carries out research funded by the Scottish Government's "Programme 1" for profitable and sustainable agriculture and the co-ordinator of Programme 1 is staff member Professor Howard Davies. The institute is also undertaking research into how climate change in Scotland will affect crop production, as the institute is involved with the Scottish Government's Agriculture and Climate Change Stakeholder Group.

References

External links
Scottish Crop Research Institute
The James Hutton Institute
Units and Institutes of the Agricultural Research Council

Research institutes in Scotland
Agricultural research institutes in the United Kingdom
Government research
Perth and Kinross
Agriculture in Scotland
1951 establishments in Scotland